JenniferSoft, Inc. is an application performance management (APM) company headquartered in Paju, South Korea. JenniferSoft develops technology for system architecture development and performance monitoring, error determination and system tuning based on “Performance Theory”.

History and Foundation 
JenniferSoft was founded in 2005 by current CEO Andy Lee. JenniferSoft started as a consulting company called Java Service before changing its name to JenniferSoft in 2007.

2005Java Service Consulting was established and the APM solution JENNIFER 2.0 was released. By the end of 2005 the company achieved US$1.1 million in license revenue.
2007The company's name was changed from Java Service to JenniferSoft and a U.S regional office was established in San Francisco. JenniferSoft attained 168 customers and achieved US$5.9 million in revenue. 
2010JenniferSoft attained 479 customers, and it was awarded the 2010 New Software presidential prize. JenniferSoft's Netherlands office was established.
2012Establishment of new headquarters in South Korea as well as JenniferSoft Europe in Austria.

Products 
JENNIFER APM (For Java, .NET and PHP) A real-time application performance management solution

Offices 
JenniferSoft Korea Gyeonggi-do, South Korea
JenniferSoft Europe Vienna, Austria
JenniferSoft Japan Tokyo, Japan
JenniferSoft Thailand Bangkok, Thailand

References
 (Korea Economic Magazine - Korean)
 Media Coverage (Hankyoreh News - Korean)
 Media Coverage (INews - Korean)
 Media Coverage (ETNews - Korean)
 Media Coverage (INews - Korean)
 (DailyGrid- Korean)

External links 
 JenniferSoft Website

Companies based in Burlingame, California
Software performance management